The Formation Reconnaissance Regiment is one of two organisations currently provided by cavalry regiments of the British Army. Until recently, it was known as the Armoured Reconnaissance Regiment.

Formation reconnaissance regiments, as the name would indicate, are intended to provide Armoured Reconnaissance for a higher-level formation, usually a division or a heavy brigade. In a large-scale defensive operation, they would delay attacking forces, whilst screening heavier units as they moved to engage the enemy. The regiments are, currently, equipped with vehicles of the CVR(T) family or Jackal or RWMIK Land Rover.

Current use
Five regular army regiments were equipped for the formation reconnaissance role:
Household Cavalry Regiment
1st The Queen's Dragoon Guards
Light Dragoons
9th/12th Royal Lancers
Queen's Royal Lancers

The Queen's Own Yeomanry and the Scottish and North Irish Yeomanry, the Territorial units equipped for this role.

Under Army 2020, this number was reduced to three regiments:
Household Cavalry Regiment
The Royal Lancers - formed 2 May 2015 by the amalgamation of the 9th/12th Royal Lancers and the Queen's Royal Lancers
The Royal Dragoon Guards - re-roled from a heavy armoured regiment to formation reconnaissance

The Light Dragoons and Queen's Dragoon Guards were re-roled into the 'light cavalry' role along with the Queen's Own Yeomanry

Organisation
For the late 1990s to early 2000s: A regiment was organised into four reconnaissance squadrons, each with three reconnaissance troops of four Scimitars and a guided weapons troop of four Strikers. The squadrons also have a support troop with four Spartan APCs, a Mechanical Engineer section with a Spartan and a Samson recovery vehicle and a Squadron Headquarters troop with two Land Rover 110 medium utility trucks, two Sultan command vehicles and a Samaritan ambulance. The main combat strength is thus 16 Strikers and 48 Scimitars.

Reconnaissance Squadron composition
Squadron Headquarters Troop
Two Land Rovers, Two FV105 Sultan command vehicles and FV104 Samaritan armoured ambulance
Three Reconnaissance Troops
Four FV107 Scimitars
Guided Weapons Troop
Four FV102 Striker anti-tank guided missile vehicles (withdrawn from service) 
Support Troop
Four FV103 Spartan armoured personnel carriers
Mechanical Engineer Section
FV103 Spartan and FV106 Samson armoured recovery vehicle

In addition to these three squadrons, a regiment also contains a Regimental Headquarters squadron, with six Sultans, a Spartan, a Samaritan and two medium utility trucks, and a Light Aid Detachment of the REME with a Sultan, a Samson, a Spartan and a Foden recovery vehicle.

In wartime, a regiment would be increased to four reconnaissance squadrons by the activation of reserve personnel and Territorial Army Yeomanry units. One of the formation reconnaissance regiments, the Household Cavalry Regiment, has a permanent fourth squadron; this is on detachment with 16 Air Assault Brigade.

History
During the early 1980s, there were four "Type A" armoured reconnaissance regiments as part of the British Army of the Rhine (BAOR), known as Divisional Reconnaissance Regiments. Each had three Sabre Squadrons; two Medium Reconnaissance Squadrons comprising four troops of 4 x Scorpions together with a Surveillance Troop of 5 x Spartan equipped with ZB298 radar, plus a Close Reconnaissance squadron of five troops of 8 x Scimitars (one for each battlegroup in the division). There were a further four "Type B" regiments based in the United Kingdom, earmarked for the reinforcement of BAOR; these had two medium reconnaissance squadrons, of Scimitars and Scorpions, and a close reconnaissance squadron equipped with Fox armoured cars. Finally, four Yeomanry regiments of the Territorial Army were intended for home defence; these had four reconnaissance squadrons of Foxes, with a small number of Ferret armoured cars.

By 1986, two regular regiments were permanently stationed in Germany, and titled as Armoured Reconnaissance Regiment (Tracked) (BAOR); these had four medium reconnaissance squadrons with Scimitars, each also having an integral guided-weapons troop of Strikers. Each of these would operate with one of BAORs armoured divisions. The third armoured division had its reconnaissance regiment based in England, equipped as a Armoured Reconnaissance Regiment (Tracked) (UK); this formation had three medium reconnaissance squadrons of Scimitars and Scorpions, and a fourth guided-weapons squadron of Strikers. A fourth regiment was also equipped to this standard, and based in the UK to support NATO mobile forces. There was a third organisation for regular forces, the Armoured Reconnaissance Regiment (UK), which had two tracked reconnaissance squadrons of Scorpions and one wheeled reconnaissance squadron of Foxes. In the Territorial Army, there were two organisations, two Yeomanry Reconnaissance Regiment (BAOR) and three Yeomanry Reconnaissance Regiment (UK). The former were equipped with three or four reconnaissance squadrons of Foxes, and intended for reinforcing units based in West Germany; the latter had three or four reconnaissance squadrons of unarmoured civilian Land Rovers, and were intended solely for home defence.

The 1993 Options for Change review cut the number of regular armoured reconnaissance regiments to two, with a third being created in 1995 by converting the Royal Armoured Corps training regiment. At this point, the regiments were quoted as a combat strength of 48 Scimitars and 12 Strikers; this is comparable to the current regimental structure, but for a four-squadron regiment.

A fourth was created in the 1998 Strategic Defence Review by converting a conventional armoured regiment to the reconnaissance role. The 1998 conversion, however, saw the regiments reduced to three squadrons rather than four, with a single Yeomanry regiment for peacetime reinforcement, with the effect that the total number of operational squadrons remained the same.

The force was increased to five regiments by the 2003 Defence White Paper, again by re-roling an armoured regiment; it is about this time that the designation Formation Reconnaissance Regiment appeared.

Notes

References

Armoured units and formations of the British Army
Tables of Organisation and Equipment